The Ohio National Life Insurance Company is no longer a mutual insurance company. The Ohio National Life Insurance Company is headquartered in Cincinnati, Ohio, United States.  Along with its affiliated companies, the Ohio National group offers life insurance, annuities, disability insurance, group retirement plans, and investment products.  It sells products in all fifty states, the District of Columbia, and Puerto Rico.

The CEO is Gary T. “Doc” Huffman, and the President and COO is Barbara A. Turner.  The company currently employs over 1,000 associates.  Ohio National was named as one of the best 15 places to work in Cincinnati in 2017 by The Cincinnati Enquirer. It was ranked #126 on the Forbes list of America's Best Midsize Employers in 2018, placing it 8th among Ohio companies and 1st among Cincinnati-area companies, and 11th nationally for midsize Banking and Financial Services companies.

Ohio National has an international presence as well, and maintains an office in Fort Lauderdale, Florida, where it manages its operations in South America.   It owns a South American subsidiary headquartered in Santiago, Chile, and sells products in Chile, Brazil, and Peru.

The company is currently rated A by Standard & Poor’s (Sep. 2018), A+ (Superior) by A.M. Best (Dec. 2018), and A1 by Moody’s (Oct. 2016).

Ohio National Mutual Holdings, Inc. is parent to the following companies:
 The Ohio National Life Insurance Company
 Ohio National Life Assurance Corporation
 Ohio National Equities, Inc.
 The O.N. Equity Sales Company
 Ohio National Investments, Inc.
 National Security Life and Annuity Company
 Ohio National Seguros de Vida, S.A.

History
Ohio National was founded as a stock company in 1909 but converted to mutual company status in 1959. In 1998, Ohio National reorganized as a mutual insurance holding company (Ohio National Mutual Holdings, Inc.), with an intermediate holding company (Ohio National Financial Services, Inc.).

In September 2018, Ohio National announced an exit from most of the annuity market, and the layoff of approximately 300 of its then 1300 employees, as part of a new focused growth strategy targeting the life insurance market.  Ohio National continues to sell life insurance, disability insurance, and immediate annuities, and reaffirmed its commitment to the Latin American market.  As a result of the change in strategy, Standard & Poor's lowered its rating from A+ to A, while Moody's reaffirmed its A1 rating and A.M. Best reaffirmed its A+ rating.

Philanthropy
In 1987, the company started The Ohio National Foundation, which has donated more than $22 million to nonprofit organizations through 2017.  Primary recipients include the United Way; the Duncanson Artist-in-Residence Program at the Taft Museum of Art recognizing contemporary African-American artists; Habitat for Humanity; and the Make-a-Wish Foundation.  In 2001, Ohio National started displaying a Victorian Holiday Village on the grounds of the headquarters each winter, and through 2017 has collected over 15 tons of donated food for charity.

References

External links
 

Companies based in Cincinnati
American companies established in 1909
Financial services companies established in 1909
Life insurance companies of the United States
Mutual insurance companies of the United States
1909 establishments in Ohio